The 2005 European Road Championships were held in Moscow, Russia, between 7 July and 10 July 2005. Regulated by the European Cycling Union. The event consisted of a road race and a time trial for men and women under 23 and juniors.

Schedule

Individual time trial 
Thursday 7 July 2005
 Women U23, 22 km
 Men Juniors, 22 km

Friday 8 July 2005
 Men U23, 33 km
 Women Juniors

Road race
Saturday 9 July 2005
 Women U23
 Men Juniors

Sunday 10 July 2005
 Men U23, 81.6 km
 Women Juniors

Events summary

Medal table

References

External links
The European Cycling Union

European Road Championships, 2005
Road cycling
European Road Championships by year
Cycling
July 2005 sports events in Russia